Kilbourn or Kilborn may refer to:

Surname:
Annelisa Kilbourn (1967–2002), British conservationist, veterinarian and wildlife expert
Antony Ferdinand Kilbourn, American De La Salle Brother, Acting President of the De La Salle College in Manila
Byron Kilbourn (1801–1870), American surveyor, railroad executive, and politician involved in the founding of Milwaukee, Wisconsin
Cecil Kilborn (born 1902), English footballer
Craig Kilborn (born 1962), American comedian, writer, producer, sports commentator, actor, media critic, and former television host
Joanne Kilbourn, fictional Canadian detective who appears in mystery novels by Gail Bowen
John Kilborn (1794–1878), A merchant
Leslie Gifford Kilborn (1895–1972), the son of Omar L. Kilborn and Retta Kilborn
Lewis Kilborn (1902–1984), the son of John Dexter Kilborn and Sarah Cahill Kilborn
Oliver Kilbourn (1904–1993), British coal miner, painter, and founding member of the Ashington Group
Pam Kilborn (born 1939), Australian former athlete 
Rosemary Kilbourn (born 1931), Canadian artist, printmaker and wood engraver
Ruth Kilbourn (born 1895), Chicago-area dancer and dance teacher
William Kilbourn, CM, FRSC (1926–1995), Canadian author and historian in Toronto, Ontario

Location:
Kilbourn, Wisconsin, former name of the city of Wisconsin Dells in south-central Wisconsin
Kilbourn Bridge, located just south of Kilbourn, Iowa, United States
Kilbourn Hill or Dexter Drumlin, a 311-foot drumlin and 38-acre open space reservation in Lancaster, Massachusetts
Abell-Kilbourn House in Martinsburg, West Virginia, associated with John N. Abell and Charles W. Kilbourn

See also
Kilbourn v. Thompson, 103 U.S. 168 (1880) was a United States Supreme Court case that dealt with the question whether or not the United States House of Representatives may compel testimony
Kilbourne (disambiguation)
Kilburn (disambiguation)